Fairfield  was an unincorporated community in Fairfield Township, Franklin County, Indiana, United States. It was depopulated in the late 1960s in preparation for construction of the Brookville Lake Dam, which was completed in 1974 after several years of delay.

History

Geography
The town was in the valley created by the East Fork of the Whitewater River, flowing southward from Union County. Its elevation was around 780 feet (238 m) above sea level.

References

 Fairfield, a comprehensive history.

Unincorporated communities in Franklin County, Indiana
Unincorporated communities in Indiana